Diastata nebulosa is a species of fly in the family Diastatidae. It is found in the  Palearctic .

References

External links
Images representing Diastata at BOLD

Diastatidae
Insects described in 1823
Muscomorph flies of Europe